Wonderland is a former settlement in Plumas County, California.

The Wonderland post office operated from 1924 to 1946.

References

Former populated places in California
Former settlements in Plumas County, California